This Ascension is a gothic/ethereal band from Santa Barbara, Southern California that formed in 1988. They released four albums and two 7" vinyl singles on their label Tess Records, between 1989 and 1999. They also released a best of compilation: "Deeper and Further Away" on Projekt Records in 2014.

This Ascension toured coast to coast in the United States in 1994, 1995, and 1997. The band also toured the west coast prolifically, sharing the stage with bands including Clan of Xymox, The Jesus and Mary Chain, Chris Isaak, The Wolfgang Press, Pixies and The Stranglers.

After Tess Records gave up the ghost in 2001, the band signed with Projekt Records. Their back catalogue was re-released, though the band became inactive soon afterwards. The group re-united with bassist Cynthia Coulter for several shows in 2004 and announced plans to write and record new material in 2013. The band also performed a reunion show in October, 2015 in Houston, Texas.

Vocalist Dru Allen (Dru) (b. 11 November 1969) has sung for the neo-classical project Mirabilis and the ambient/electronic act Falling You. Dru and Cynthia Coulter have gone on to join Erick R. Scheid in the ethereal goth/shoegazing band Mercury's Antennae.

Bassist Cynthia Coulter (Cindy) (b. 22 February 1971), younger sister of William Faith (William Coulter), went on to become the touring bassist for Faith & the Muse from 1999 - 2007. She later relocated from Van Nuys, CA to Portland, OR and became the bassist for the Portland-based band 'Pitchfork Motorway'.

Founding guitarist Kevin Serra (b. 4 July 1971), studied music theory in New York, and ran the music review site Kevchino. Serra records music for a singles project with guest vocalists under the name Cloud Seeding. The first single "Ink Jar/Unquestioning" features Boston's Marissa Nadler, which was followed by a second single "The Light."

Former Bassist Charlie Dennis re-joined his previous band Nerf Herder.

This Ascension's cover of the song "Carol Of The Bells" was featured on ABC TV show Brothers & Sisters (2006 TV series) during the episode "Cold Turkey" which aired on December 12, 2010.

Discography

Albums
 Tears in Rain (LP/CD) - Tess Records - 1989
 Light and Shade (CD) - Tess Records - 1991
 Walk Softly, A Dream Lies Here (CD) - Tess Records - 1994
 Sever (CD) - Tess Records - 1999
 Deeper and Further Away (Digital) - Projekt: Archive - 2014

Singles
 Isabella (7" single) - Tess Records - 1989
 Spirit of Christmas Past (7" single) - Tess Records - 1997

External links
 Cyberia - This Ascension homepage
 Cindy's Myspace page
 Dru's homepage
 Mercury's Antennae
 Tess Records
 Projekt Records Artist page

American gothic rock groups
Projekt Records artists
Musical groups established in 1988
1988 establishments in California
Ethereal wave musical groups